The Battle of Fort d'Issy took place in April and May 1871 between the Paris Commune and Versaillais government forces at Fort d'Issy, south of Paris, France.

Bibliography 

 
 

Paris Commune
19th century in Paris
April 1871 events
Fort d'Issy
Fort d'Issy
History of Hauts-de-Seine